The 1986 FA Cup final was the 105th final of the FA Cup. It took place on 10 May 1986 at Wembley Stadium and was a Merseyside derby between Liverpool and Everton. The match was played seven days after Liverpool had secured the league title, with Everton finishing as runners-up. At the time, Liverpool and Everton were widely regarded as the two leading English clubs.

Summary
Liverpool won the match 3–1, thus completing the Double in Kenny Dalglish’s first season as a player manager.  Everton led at half-time through Gary Lineker, before the second half saw Ian Rush score two goals and Craig Johnston one. As Liverpool had already won the league, Everton would have claimed a place in the 1986–87 European Cup Winners' Cup, but the ban on English clubs in European competitions following the Heysel disaster the previous season meant that they were unable to do so (in addition to Liverpool not claiming a place in the European Cup for their league win).	

This was Liverpool's third FA Cup Final victory, and their first since 1974. Everton, meanwhile, were playing in their third consecutive FA Cup Final and suffered their second consecutive defeat; notable changes from the side that had lost to Manchester United the previous year were Bobby Mimms in goal in place of the injured Neville Southall – Everton had signed veteran Pat Jennings on a short-term deal as emergency cover – and new signing Gary Lineker playing in the forward position that had previously been occupied by Andy Gray.

As substitute Steve McMahon was unused, Liverpool became the first team to compete in the FA Cup Final without fielding an English capped player since Queen's Park understandably fielded all-Scottish teams in 1884 and 1885 (Mark Lawrenson was English-born but represented the Republic of Ireland at international level while Craig Johnston had played for England Under-21s despite having Australian nationality).

Twenty years later, in April 2006, the final was replayed in a charity game at Anfield, in aid of The Marina Dalglish Appeal. Liverpool won again, this time on a 1–0 scoreline, thanks to a late goal from John Durnin.

Match details

References

External links
LFC History Report
BBC Article on the match
Guardian As It Happened

1986
Final
Fa Cup Final 1986
Fa Cup Final 1986
FA Cup Final
May 1986 sports events in the United Kingdom